KNTU (88.1 FM) is the campus radio station of the University of North Texas in Denton, Texas. The signal of the station covers much of the Dallas and Fort Worth Metroplex of North Texas with an alternative rock format. Any University of North Texas student is welcome to work at the station.

KNTU also produces the UNT football and men's basketball broadcast feeds for the Mean Green Sports Network, a radio property of Learfield, but no longer airs the games on 88.1 FM. UNT women's basketball will move to streaming only on Learfield's Varsity App beginning with the 2022-23 season.

History
KNTU was founded in 1969 in part by Bill Mercer, former voice of the Dallas Cowboys, North Texas Mean Green, and a member of the Texas Radio Hall of Fame. Originally on the 88.5 FM frequency, the station officially went on the air on October 31, 1969. Along with music, Mean Green football game broadcasts were soon added, with Mercer providing play-by-play coverage and UNT students usually serving as his color commentators.

The station switched to a jazz format in 1981, while continuing to host public affairs shows and North Texas athletic events. While KNTU had no direct competitors, it shared audiences with 106.1 from 1987 to 1992 and 107.5 from 1992 to 2006 (both with the KOAI callsigns) as smooth jazz-formatted stations branded "The Oasis."

On July 29, 2022, KNTU switched to an alternative rock format,"88.1 indie," reflecting the station's independent status with a playlist of alternative rock artists. The first song was "Icky Thump" by the White Stripes. The jazz format continues to stream online. KNTU also announced its intent to launch its HD Radio signal in late 2022/early 2023 and add the jazz format to 88.1 HD2.

The latest format flip puts KNTU in competition with North Texas Public Broadcasting's Adult album alternative-formatted KKXT (91.7), iHeartMedia-owned KDGE (102.1 The Edge HD2), and Audacy-owned KVIL (Alt 103.7).

Programming

In addition to its alternative format, KNTU broadcasts "North Texas In Focus," a public affairs show on Sunday at 6 a.m.

Signal
Unlike most of the area's FM stations (like competitor KVIL) which transmit their signals from Cedar Hill, KNTU transmits its signal from north Denton on land owned by UNT which was a Nike Missile Base. Therefore, KNTU's signal is much stronger in the Northern parts of the Dallas/Fort Worth Metroplex as well as the cities of Denton, Decatur, McKinney, and Gainesville, but is considerably weaker in Dallas, Fort Worth, and areas south of the Metroplex. The station installed a new antenna during the first week of November 2022.

Notable former KNTU students
 George Dunham (KTCK The Ticket)
 Craig Miller (KTCK The Ticket)
 Sean Bass (Sports Director, KTCK The Ticket)
 Mark Followill (PxP Dallas Mavericks, FC Dallas)
 Dave Barnett (PxP Dallas Mavericks, San Antonio Spurs, Texas Rangers)
 Craig Way (Voice of the Texas Longhorns)
 Tommy Bonk (LA Times writer who coined the phrase "Phi Slama Jama")

References

External links
KNTU website
University of North Texas Department of Media Arts

 DFW Radio/TV History

University of North Texas
NTU
NTU
Radio stations established in 1969
1969 establishments in Texas
Radio and TV
Alternative rock radio stations in the United States